Princess Helen of Waldeck and Pyrmont VA, CI, RRC, GCStJ (later Duchess of Albany; 17 February 1861 – 1 September 1922) was a member of the British royal family by marriage. She was the fifth daughter and child of George Victor, Prince of Waldeck and Pyrmont, and his first wife, Princess Helena of Nassau.

Family
Helen was born in Arolsen, capital of Waldeck principality, in Germany.
She was the sister of Friedrich, last reigning Prince of Waldeck and Pyrmont; Marie, the first wife of William II of Württemberg; and of Emma, Queen consort of William III of the Netherlands (and mother of Queen Wilhelmina).

Marriage

Along with Emma and a third sister, Pauline, Helen was considered as a second wife for their distant cousin William III of the Netherlands. She later met with another distant cousin Prince Leopold, Duke of Albany, youngest son of Queen Victoria, at the suggestion of his mother. The two became engaged in November 1881.

On 27 April 1882, Leopold and Helen married in St. George's Chapel, Windsor Castle. After their wedding, Leopold and Helen resided at Claremont House.  The couple had a brief, but happy marriage, ending in the hemophiliac Leopold's death from a fall in Cannes, France, in March 1884.  At the time of Leopold's death, Helen was pregnant with their second child.

The couple had two children:
 Princess Alice of Albany (1883–1981), later Countess of Athlone
 Prince Charles Edward, Duke of Albany (1884–1954), later Duke of Saxe-Coburg and Gotha.

Personality and social work

According to the memoirs of Helen's daughter, Princess Alice of Albany, Helen was very intelligent, had a strong sense of duty, and a genuine love of welfare work. Queen Victoria, initially worried that Helen might turn out to be a stereotypically remote German Princess, remarked in a letter to her eldest daughter, German Crown Princess Victoria, that she was pleased Helen liked 'to go among the people.' The Queen soon came to regard her young daughter-in-law with great respect and affection, notwithstanding her initial concerns upon hearing from the match-making Vicky that Helen was an "intellectual", being unusually well-educated for a princess. Before her marriage, Helen's father had made her superintendent of the infant schools in his principality, and in this position the Princess had devised the pupils' educational curriculum. Helen particularly enjoyed solving mathematical problems and reading philosophy: during their tragically brief marriage, Prince Leopold proudly introduced his wife to the circle of academics he'd befriended at Oxford University. Helen maintained these friendships for the rest of her life.

In 1894, Helen was one of the founders of the Deptford Fund, which instigated many projects to help the local community in Deptford. In 1899 Helen opened the Albany Institute. This later expanded into a combined community/performance centre with the theatre venue known as the Albany Empire. A centre of 1970s anti-fascist activity and Rock Against Racism, the Empire and Institute buildings were destroyed in an arson attack in 1978. A new Albany Theatre was opened by the Princess of Wales in 1982.

Helen was also involved in several hospital charities and with those dedicated to ending human trafficking. During World War I, she organised much of her charity work along with that of her sister-in-law Princess Beatrice and husband's niece Princess Marie-Louise to avoid the not-uncommon problem of conflicting (and sometimes misguided) royal war-work projects.

Later life
After Leopold's death, Helen and her two children, Alice and Charles Edward, continued to reside at Claremont House. After the death of her nephew, the Hereditary Prince of Saxe-Coburg and Gotha in 1899, Helen's sixteen-year-old son was selected as the new heir to the German duchy, and was parted from his mother and sister in order to take up residence there. When the First World War broke out 14 years later, Charles Edward found himself fighting in the German Army. As a result, he was stripped of his British titles by an act of Parliament in 1917. By contrast, her daughter Alice remained in England and by marriage to Prince Alexander of Teck in 1904 became a sister-in-law of Queen Mary, consort of King George V.

Helen died on 1 September 1922 of a heart attack in Hinterriss in Tyrol, Austria, while visiting her beloved son, Charles Edward. Through her son, she is the great-grandmother of Carl XVI Gustaf of Sweden.

On her death her estate was valued at £177,312 (resworn £183,053 and equivalent to £7.2 million in 2022).

The Chiswick streets Waldeck Road and Pyrmont Road were named in honour of her.

Issue

Ancestry

Notes

1861 births
1922 deaths
People from Bad Arolsen
People from the Principality of Waldeck and Pyrmont
House of Saxe-Coburg and Gotha (United Kingdom)
House of Windsor
Wives of British princes
Albany
Ladies of the Royal Order of Victoria and Albert
Companions of the Order of the Crown of India
Members of the Royal Red Cross
Dames of Justice of the Order of St John
House of Waldeck and Pyrmont
Princesses of Waldeck and Pyrmont
Daughters of monarchs